The culture of Vietnam (chữ Nôm: 文化越南) are the customs and traditions of the Kinh people and the other ethnic groups of Vietnam. Vietnam is part of the Sinosphere due to the influence of Chinese culture on Vietnamese culture, as well as part of Southeast Asia.

Ancient Vietnamese cultural artifacts, such as Dong Son drums were found spread throughout Southeast Asia and South China, suggesting a spread of ancient Viet (Yue) culture all the way south to Indonesia. Vietnamese culture was heavily influenced by Chinese culture due to the "1000 years of Northern Rule". During this period and until the 19th century, Classical Chinese (Hán văn) was the language used for formal writing. Between the 15th and 19th centuries, popular literature and folk songs were written in the Vietnamese language using a Vietnamese script (chữ Nôm) derived from Chinese characters (chữ Hán).

Following independence from China in the 10th century, Vietnam began a southward expansion and annexed territories formerly belonging to Champa and Khmer, resulting in various influences on the Vietnamese. During the French colonial period, Catholicism, and a Latin script romanizing the Vietnamese language, the Vietnamese alphabet, were introduced in Vietnam.

Some elements considered to be characteristic of Vietnamese culture include ancestor veneration, respect for community and family, and living in harmony with nature.

Language 

Vietnam is one of the most linguistic diverse countries in Southeast Asia. Although Vietnamese is set as the official language of Vietnam, there are currently more than 100 speaking languages in the country. They belong to five different major linguistic families: Austronesian, Austroasiatic, Hmong–Mien, Sino–Tibetan, and Kra–Dai. The Vietnamese language contains a large body of Sino-Vietnamese vocabulary.

The Vietnamese language is an Austroasiatic language with monosyllabic and tonal features, sharing similarities with some Northern Austroasiatic languages, such as Bolyu. The writing of Vietnamese started with Vietnamese script (chữ Nôm) in the 13th century which used Chinese script as a basis, to the current Latin iteration (chữ Quốc Ngữ).

The current Vietnamese alphabet uses diacritics (glyph added to a letter) to represent tones in Vietnamese writing. When computerised, digraphs are used. For example, input 'a' generates 'a', but input  'aa' generates â.

The Vietnamese Latin alphabet uses the horn for the letters "ơ" and "ư"; the circumflex for the letters "â", "ê", and "ô"; the breve for the letter "ă"; and a bar through the letter "đ".

It also has six tones: "á", "à", "ả", "ã" and "ạ", the five tones used for vowels along with flat tone "a".

Literature

The first evidence of writing in Vietnam appeared after the Han conquest of Nanyue (111 BC) with the introducing of Old Chinese and Classical Chinese in modern-day North and Central Vietnam. They, however, only had been materialized in form of fragments, short sentences engraved on bricks and coins. The first surviving literature in Vietnam is the Sanskrit Võ Cạnh inscription (4th century AD) near Nha Trang, which belongs to either Funan or Chamic culture. Following Võ Cạnh is the Old Cham Đông Yên Châu inscription near Trà Kiệu, dating from late 4th century, was erected by King Bhadravarman I of Champa, and was written in Old Southern Brahmic script. It remains today as the oldest attested epigraph of any Southeast Asian language, predating Mon, Khmer, Malay by centuries.

Historically Vietnamese literature was initially written in chữ Hán and then chữ Nôm. Literature using Nôm script began roughly in the 10th century. Up until the 21st century, there had been two components existing at the same time: works written in Literary Chinese (with poems and prose demonstrating Vietnamese history and realities; thus, they are regarded as Vietnamese literature) and works written in Nôm script (mostly poems).

Since the 1920s, literature has been mainly composed in the national language script (Vietnamese alphabet) with profound renovations in form and category such as novels, new-style poems, short stories and dramas,  and with diversity in artistic tendency. Written literature attained speedy development after the August Revolution, when it was directed by the Vietnamese Communist Party's guideline and focused on the people's fighting and work life.

Classical literature include Truyện Kiều (The Tale of Kieu) (Nguyễn Du), Cung Oán Ngâm Khúc (Complaint of a Palace Maid) (Nguyễn Gia Thiều), Chinh phụ ngâm (Lament of the soldier's wife) (Đặng Trần Côn), and Quốc âm Thi Tập (Poetry Collection) (Nguyễn Trãi), all of which are transliterated or annotated in chữ Quốc ngữ. Some famous female poets include Hồ Xuân Hương, Đoàn Thị Điểm, and Bà Huyện Thanh Quan.

Modern Vietnamese literature has developed from romanticism to realism, from heroism in wartime to all aspects of life, and developed into ordinary life of the Vietnamese.

Poetry

Vietnam has had a diverse range of cultural poetry throughout its history. Historically, Vietnamese poetry consists of three language traditions. Each poetry was written exclusively in Classical Chinese and later incorporated Sino-Vietnamese vocabulary. It was also often centered around the themes and traditions of Buddhism and Confucianism.

This style of poetry remained prominent until the 13th century. Thereafter, poetry and literature in the Vietnamese language emerged as the primary rival to literature written in Classical Chinese.

The chữ Nôm writing system for the Vietnamese language was adapted for Vietnamese poetry. This writing system was also sanctioned by the Vietnamese government and recognized as the primary language of the nation. It remained as the main writing system for Vietnamese poetry until the end of the 20th century.

However, this was changed upon the advent of European rule from the introduction of the romanized script (known as chữ Quốc Ngữ) As a result, the precise meaning of Vietnamese poems in Hán Nôm may have gotten lost in the translation process to chữ Quốc Ngữ.

Visual arts

Traditional Vietnamese art is a part of art practiced in Vietnam or by Vietnamese artists, from ancient times (including the elaborate Đông Sơn drums) to post-Chinese domination art which was strongly influenced by Chinese Buddhist art, as well as Taoism and Confucianism. The art of Champa and France also played a smaller role later on.

The Chinese influence on Vietnamese art extends into Vietnamese pottery and ceramics, calligraphy, and traditional architecture.  Currently, Vietnamese lacquer paintings have proven to be quite popular.

Calligraphy

Calligraphy has had a long history in Vietnam, previously using chữ Hán along with chữ Nôm.  However, most modern Vietnamese calligraphy instead uses the Roman-character based Viẹtnamese alphabet, which has proven to be very popular.

In the past, when literacy in the old character-based writing systems of were restricted to Vietnamese scholars, calligraphy nevertheless still played an important part in Vietnamese life. On special occasions such as Lunar New Year, people would go to scholars to make them a calligraphy hanging (often poetry, folk sayings or even single words).

Silk painting

Vietnamese silk painting is one of the most popular forms of art in Vietnam, favored for the mystical atmosphere that can be achieved with the medium.  During the 19th and 20th centuries, French influence was absorbed into Vietnamese art and the liberal and modern use of color especially began to differentiate Vietnamese silk paintings from their Chinese, Japanese and Korean counterparts. Vietnamese silk paintings typically showcase the countryside, landscapes, pagodas, historical events or scenes of daily life.

Woodblock prints

A folk art with a long history in Vietnam, Vietnamese woodblock prints have reached a level of popularity outside of Vietnam.  Organic materials are used to make the paint, which is applied to wood and pressed on paper.  The process is repeated with different colors.

Performing arts

Music

Vietnamese music varies slightly in the three regions: North, Central, and South. Northern classical music is Vietnam's oldest and is traditionally more formal. Vietnamese classical music can be traced to the Mongol invasions, when the Vietnamese captured a Chinese opera troupe. Central classical music shows the influences of Champa culture with its melancholic melodies. Southern music exudes a lively laissez-faire attitude.

Vietnam has some 50 national music instruments, in which the set of percussion instruments is the most popular, diverse and long-lasting such as đàn đáy, đàn tranh, đàn nhị, đàn bầu ... The set of blowing instruments is represented by flutes and pan-pipes, while the set of string instruments is specified by đàn bầu and đàn đáy.

Vietnamese folksongs are rich in forms and melodies of regions across the country, ranging from ngâm thơ (reciting poems), hát ru (lullaby), hò (chanty) to hát quan họ, trong quan, xoan, dum, ví giặm, ca Huế, bài chòi, ly. Apart from this, there are also other forms like hát xẩm, chầu văn, and ca trù.

Two of the most well-known Vietnamese traditional genres are:
 Imperial Court music: When referring specifically to the "Nhã nhạc" form it includes court music from the Trần dynasty on to the Nguyễn dynasty. It is an elaborate form of music which features an extensive array of musicians and dancers, dressed in extravagant costumes. It was an integral part of the rituals of the Imperial court.
 Ca trù: An ancient form of chamber music which originated in the imperial court.  It gradually came to be associated with a pansori-type of entertainment where talented female musicians entertained rich and powerful men, often scholars and bureaucrats who most enjoyed the genre.  It was condemned in the 20th century by the government, being tied falsely with prostitution, but recently it has seen a revival as appreciation for its cultural significance has grown. Ca trù has been recognized by UNESCO as a Masterpiece of the Oral and Intangible Heritage of Humanity since 2005.

In the 20th century, in contact with the Western culture, especially after national independence, many new categories of arts like plays, photography, cinemas, and modern art had taken shape and developed strongly, obtaining huge achievements with the contents reflecting the social and revolutionary realities. Up to 1997, there have been 44 people operating in cultural and artistic fields honored with the Hồ Chi Minh Award, 130 others conferred with People's Artist Honor, and 1011 people awarded with the Excellent Artist Honor. At the start of 1997, there were 191 professional artistic organizations and 26 film studios (including central and local ones). There have been 28 movies, 49 scientific and documentary films receiving international motion picture awards in many countries.

Theatre

 Hát tuồng (also known as Hát bội): Traditional Vietnamese opera: A theatre form influenced by Chinese opera, it transitioned from being entertainment for the royal court to travelling troupes who performed for commoners and peasants, featuring many well-known stock characters.
 Cải lương: A kind of modern folk opera originating from south Vietnam, which utilizes extensive vibrato techniques.  It remains very popular in modern Vietnam when compared to other folk styles.
 Hát chèo: Chèo is a form of generally satirical musical theatre, often encompassing dance, traditionally performed by Vietnamese peasants in north Vietnam. It is usually performed outdoors by semi-amateur touring groups, stereotypically in a village square or the courtyard of a public building, although it is today increasingly also performed indoors and by professional performers

Water puppetry

Water puppetry, is a distinct Vietnamese art form which had its origins in the 10th century and very popular in northern region. In Water puppetry a split-bamboo screen obscures puppets which stand in water, and are manipulated using long poles hidden beneath the water. Epic story lines are played out with many different puppets, often using traditional scenes of Vietnamese life. The puppets are made from quality wood, such as the Southeast Asian jackfruit tree. Each puppet is carefully carved, and then painted with numerous successive layers of paint in order to protect the puppets.

Despite nearly dying out in the 20th century, water puppetry has been recognized by the Vietnamese government as an important part of Vietnam's cultural heritage. Today, puppetry is commonly performed by professional puppeteers, who typically are taught by their elders in rural areas of Vietnam.

Dance

Vietnam also has 54 different ethnicities, each with their own tradition.  Among the ethnic Vietnamese majority, there are several traditional dances performed widely at festivals and other special occasions, such as the lion dance.

In the imperial court, there also developed throughout the centuries a series of complex court dances which require great skill. Some of the more widely known are the imperial lantern dance, fan dance, and platter dance, among others.

Cinema

Cuisine

Vietnamese cuisine is extremely diverse, often divided into three main categories, each pertaining to Vietnam's three main regions (north, central and south). It uses very little oil and many vegetables, and is mainly based on rice and fish sauce. Its characteristic flavors are sweet (sugar), spicy (Bird's eye chili), sour (lime), nước mắm (fish sauce), and flavored by a variety of mint and basil.

Vietnam also has a large variety of noodles and noodle soups. Different regions invented typically different types of noodles, varying in shapes, tastes, colors, etc. One of the nation's most famous type of noodles is phở, a type of noodle soup originating in North Vietnam, which consists of rice noodles and beef soup (sometimes chicken soup) with several other ingredients such as bean sprouts and scallions (spring onions). It is often eaten for breakfast, but also makes a satisfying lunch or light dinner. The boiling stock, fragrant with spices and sauces, is poured over the noodles and vegetables, poaching the paper-thin slices of raw beef just before serving. Phở is meant to be savored, incorporating several different flavors: the sweet flavour of beef, sour lemons, salty fish sauce, and fresh vegetables.

Chopsticks (chữ  Nôm: 𥮊 or 𥯖) are a common utensil in Vietnam.

Religion & philosophy

Besides folk religion, religion in Vietnam has historically been a mix of Buddhism, Confucianism, and Taoism, known in Vietnamese as the Tam Giáo ("the three religions"). Recently, scholars have provided empirical evidence on the existence of the socio-cultural phenomenon called "cultural additivity" in Vietnamese history and society.

Catholicism is also practiced in modern Vietnam.

Ancestor worship and filial piety is commonly practised amongst the older generation of Vietnamese. Most Vietnamese, regardless of religious denomination, practice ancestor worship and have an ancestor altar at their home or business.

Đạo Mẫu, or the worship of mother goddesses, was established in Vietnam in the 16th century and draws together various disparate beliefs and practices.

Funeral ceremony

Wake
When a death occurs in a Vietnamese household, the family members of the deceased would hold a wake ceremony or vigil that typically lasts for approximately five to six days. However, the duration of the ceremony may extend if the family is expecting the arrival of relatives residing abroad. The body is washed and dressed. A chopstick, is laid between the teeth and a pinch of rice and three coins are placed in the mouth. The body is put on a grass mat laid on the ground according to the saying, "being born from the earth, one must return to the earth." The dead body is enveloped with white cloth, lễ khâm niệm, and placed in a coffin, lễ nhập quan. Finally, the funeral ceremony, lễ thành phục, is officially performed.

Funeral
The surviving family wear coarse gauze turbans and tunics for the funeral. There are two types of funeral processions:
 Traditional: The date and time for the funeral procession, lễ đưa tang, must be carefully selected. Relatives, friends, and descendants take part in the funeral procession to accompany the dead along the way to the burial ground. Votives are dropped along the way. At the grave site, the coffin is lowered and buried. After three days of mourning, the family visits the tomb again, lễ mở cửa ma, or worship the opening of the grave. After 49 days, lễ chung thất, the family stops bringing rice for the dead to the altar. And finally, after 100 days, the family celebrates tốt khốc, or the end of the tears. After one year is the ceremony of the first anniversary of the relative's death and after two years is the ceremony of the end of mourning. 
 Modern: Nowadays, mourning ceremonies follow new rituals which are simplified; they consist of covering and putting the dead body into the coffin, the funeral procession, the burial of the sike into the grave, and the visits to the tomb.

Traditional clothing

In feudal Vietnam, clothing was one of the most important marks of social status and strict dress codes were enforced. After the Ming conquest of Vietnam, Ming-style clothing was imposed by a Ming official within a month. Due to the previous centuries of conflict between China and Vietnam, Ming administrators said that their mission was to attempt to "civilize" the unorthodox Vietnamese "barbarians", which ironically reduced the amount of Taoist institutions in the process.

Prior to the Nguyễn dynasty, people not of noble birth could dress quite liberally with only few restrictions on styles. For example, wearing yellow color in the Lý dynasty was tolerable since the Imperial clan wore red and white color. However, things changed at the beginning of the Nguyễn dynasty. Commoners now had a limited choice of similarly plain and simple clothes for every day use, as well as being limited in the colors they were allowed to use.  For instance, commoners were not allowed to wear clothes with dyes other than black, brown or white (with the exception of special occasions such as festivals), but in actuality these rules could change often based upon the whims of the current ruler.

The áo tràng vạt was a traditional cross-collared robe worn by Vietnamese before the 19th century. During the Nguyễn dynasty, it was replaced by the áo ngũ thân and became obsolete.

The áo tứ thân or "four-part dress" is one such example of an ancient dress widely worn by commoner women, along with the áo yếm bodice which accompanied it. Peasants across the country also gradually came to wear silk pajama-like costumes, known as "áo cánh" in the north and áo bà ba in the south.

The headgear differed from time to time. People of the Lý dynasty and Nguyễn dynasty often put on a plain piece of cloth wrapped around the head (generally called khăn đóng), while in Trần dynasty and Lê dynasty leaving the head bare was more common. Beside the popular nón lá (conical hat), a vast array of other hats and caps were available, constructed from numerous different types of materials, ranging from silk to bamboo and horse hair. Even the nón lá (conical hat) came in several different shapes and sizes, now only two styles still persist. For footwear peasants would often go barefoot, whereas sandals and shoes were reserved for the aristocracy and royalty.

Nguyễn emperors had the exclusive right to wear the color gold, while nobles wore red or purple. In the past the situation was different, Đinh dynasty and Lý dynasty rulers wore red, and Trần dynasty emperors wore white. Each member of the royal court had an assortment of different formal gowns they would wear at a particular ceremony, or for a particular occasion.  The rules governing the fashion of the royal court could change dynasty by dynasty, thus costumes of the Vietnamese court were quite diverse. However, certain fundamental concepts applied.

Adoption and enforcement of áo ngũ thân (the predecessor of the áo dài)  took place in the mid 18th century by the rulers of Đàng Trong. They decided that their garments had to be distinctive to set themselves apart from the people of Đàng Ngoài where áo tràng vạt and nhu quần were worn. White áo dài is the required uniform for girls in many high schools across Vietnam. In some types of offices (e.g. receptionists, secretaries, tour guides), women are also required to wear áo dài.

In daily life, the traditional Vietnamese styles are now replaced by Western styles. Traditional clothing is worn instead on special occasions, with the exception of the white áo dài commonly seen with high school girls in Vietnam.

Traditional martial arts

Vietnamese martial arts are highly developed from the country's long history of warfare and attempts to defend itself from foreign occupation. Although most heavily influenced by Chinese martial arts, they have developed their own characteristics throughout the millennia in combination with other influences from their neighbours. Vietnamese martial arts are deeply spiritual due to the influence of Confucianism, Buddhism and Taoism, and are strongly reliant on the "Việt Võ Đạo" (philosophy of Vietnamese martial arts).

The general Vietnamese term for martial arts is "Võ Thuật". Some of the more popular include:

 Võ Cổ Truyền Việt Nam (Võ Thuật Cổ Truyền Việt Nam)
 Vovinam (Việt Võ Đạo)
 Võ Thuật Văn Võ Đạo
 Võ thuật Bình Định
 Võ Bắc Ninh
 Võ Nam Huỳnh Đạo (Master Nam Huỳnh Đạo)

Vietnamese martial arts remain relatively unknown in the world today when compared to their counterparts from China, Japan, Korea or Thailand. However, this is seeing a definite change as schools teaching various styles of Vietnamese martial arts are starting to pop up all over the world, notably in countries such as Spain.

Traditional kinship

In traditional Vietnamese culture, kinship plays an important role in Vietnam. Whilst Western culture is known for its emphasis on individualism, Vietnamese culture places value on the roles of family. For specific information, see Vietnamese pronouns. In current rural Vietnam, one can still see three or four generations living under one roof.

Communication culture in traditional Vietnamese families tends to follow the top-down stereotype and is highly hierarchical. Vietnamese people transmit the family culture through teach communication. The three core relationships in the Vietnamese society are king - people, father - child, wife - husband. The father - child, wife - husband relationship shows that the father has the biggest role and position in the family and has a strong influence on the rest of the family. Today, the father - child relationship has started to transition into a parent child relationship as both parents have profound influence on their children.

Feudal eras

Pre-Sinicization Nanyue 

Prior to Han Chinese migration from the north, the Yue tribes cultivated wet rice, practiced fishing and slash-and-burn agriculture, domesticated water buffalo, built stilt houses, tattooed their faces, and dominated the coastal regions from shores all the way to the fertile valleys in the interior mountains. They also practiced teeth blackening. Water transport was paramount in the south, so the Yue became advanced in shipbuilding and developed maritime warfare technology mapping trade routes to Eastern coasts of China and Southeast Asia.

The ancient Han Chinese referred to the various tribal groups of people living in southern China and northern Vietnam as the Baiyue people (a group that existed from 1000 BC to 1000 AD), saying that they possessed habits like adapting to water, having their hair cropped short, and possessing body tattoos. The ancient Northern Yue are considered one of the progenitor groups of modern Lingnan culture (Cantonese culture), while the Southern Yue people are considered one of the progenitor groups of modern Vietnamese culture. Ancient Han Chinese had described ancient Yue people occupying Nanyue as barbaric, comparing their language to animal shrieking and had regarded them as lacking morals and modesty.

Ming rule

During the Ming rule of Vietnam after the Ming–Hồ War, the Vietnamese were ordered to stop grow their hair long, switch to Han Chinese style clothing, and stop the practice of teeth blackening so that they could have white teeth and long hair like the Chinese.

Later cultural relations with neighbors
A royal edict was issued by the Lê dynasty in 1474 forbidding Vietnamese from adopting foreign languages, hairstyles and clothing of the Lao, Champa or the "Northerners" which referred to the Ming. The edict was recorded in the 1479 Complete Chronicle of Dai Viet (Ngô Sĩ Liên).

According to Nayan Chanda, the Vietnamese had adopted Sinocentric views towards their surrounding neighbors such as the Chams and Cambodians, and considered non-Sinospheric cultures as barbaric. David G. Marr noted that a possible reason for social stratification, such as with the Montagnards and the Việt, were that other ethnic groups did not share the same passion for wet-rice cultivation as the Vietnamese Kinh people did.

By the Nguyễn dynasty the Vietnamese themselves were ordering Cambodian Khmer to adopt Han culture style by ceasing habits like cropping hair and ordering them to grow it long besides making them replace skirts with trousers. Han Chinese Ming dynasty refugees numbering 3,000 came to Vietnam at the end of the Ming dynasty. They opposed the Qing dynasty and were fiercely loyal to the Ming dynasty. Their descendants became known as Minh Hương. They did not wear Manchu hairstyle unlike later Chinese migrants to Vietnam during the Qing dynasty.

Both the Lingnan and historical Northern Vietnamese cultures are similar in possessing Nanyue and Han Chinese culture.

Holidays and other important days

Vietnam celebrates many holidays, including traditional holidays which have been celebrated in Vietnam for thousands of years, along with modern holidays imported predominantly from western countries.

Among the traditional holidays, the two most important and widely celebrated are the Lunar new year (Tết), followed by the Mid-autumn lantern festival (Tết Trung Thu), although the latter has been losing ground in recent years.

Public holidays

Other holidays

World and intangible cultural heritage
Vietnam has a number of UNESCO-listed World Heritage Sites, as well as cultural relics deemed as intangible heritage. These are split into specific categories:

Cultural heritage sites
 Hội An: An ancient city and trading centre.
 Imperial city of Huế: Complex of monuments in the former imperial capital.
 Mỹ Sơn: Ancient temple complex of the former Champa civilization in Quảng Nam Province.
 Imperial Citadel of Thăng Long: Hanoi old city
 One Pillar Pagoda: The pagoda is a historic Buddhist temple in the central Ba Đình district (near the Imperial Citadel of Thăng Long), Hanoi, the capital of Vietnam

Natural heritage sites
 Phong Nha Cave located in Quảng Bình Province
 Hạ Long Bay
 Đồng Văn Karst Plateau Geopark

Intangible cultural heritage
 Nhã nhạc: a form of Vietnamese court music
 Cải lương: Southern Vietnam-styled opera
 Space of gong culture
 Ca trù
 Quan họ

There are a number of other potential world heritage sites, as well as intangible cultural heritage which Vietnam has completed documents on for UNESCO's recognition in the future.

See also

 Baiyue
 Champa
 Indigenous peoples of Vietnam Central Highlands
 History of Vietnam
 List of museums in Vietnam
 Media of Vietnam
 Social issues in Vietnam
 Vietnamese language
 Vietnamese name
 Vietnamese studies

References

 
Articles containing video clips